Hodyszewo  (Hodyshiv) is a village in the administrative district of Gmina Nowe Piekuty, within Wysokie Mazowieckie County, Podlaskie Voivodeship, in north-eastern Poland.

The village has a population of 139 as of 2011.

References

Hodyszewo